Witter may refer to:


People
 Witter (surname)
 Witter Bynner (1881–1968), American poet and translator

Places
 Witter, Arkansas, an unincorporated community
 Witter, California, alternate name of Witter Springs, California
 Witter (civil parish), a civil parish in County Down, Northern Ireland
 Witter Field, a minor-league baseball ballpark in Wisconsin Rapids, Wisconsin

Other uses
 , a World War II destroyer escort

See also
 Witter Field, baseball ballpark in Wisconsin Rapids, Wisconsin
 Witter House, Chaplin, Connecticut, on the National Register of Historic Places
 Dean Witter Reynolds, New York City, American financial company